Nagari Assembly constituency is a constituency of the Andhra Pradesh Legislative Assembly, India. It is named after the town of Nagari and is one among the 7 constituencies in Chittoor district.

Actress turned Politician RK Roja won as YSR Congress from Nagari Assembly Constituency against TDP strongman Gali Muddu Krishnama Naidu with a majority of less than 1000 votes in 2014 elections.

Mandals

Members of Legislative Assembly Nagari

Election Results

Assembly Elections 2009

Assembly elections 2014

Assembly elections 2019

See also
 List of constituencies of Andhra Pradesh Vidhan Sabha

Assembly constituencies of Andhra Pradesh